Skylar Alexandra Morton (born April 24, 1994) is an American tennis player.

Morton has a career high WTA singles ranking of 1198 achieved on December 19, 2011.

Morton made her WTA main draw debut at the 2017 Citi Open in the doubles draw partnering Alana Smith.

Morton played college tennis at the University of Virginia and UCLA.

References

External links

1994 births
Living people
American female tennis players
People from Bethesda, Maryland
UCLA Bruins women's tennis players
Virginia Cavaliers women's tennis players
Tennis people from Maryland